Fri. Sat. Sun (often stylised as FRI. SAT. SUN) is the tenth EP by South Korean girl group, Dal Shabet. The EP consists of five songs. It was released on September 29, 2016, along with a music video for the title track.

Background and release 
On September 16, 2016, Dal Shabet announced the name of date of their upcoming mini album. The comeback schedule was revealed on September 17 stating that over the next few days the group would release individual member teaser images, special teasers, music video teasers, an album highlight medley, and an unveiling of the official track list.

Singles 
The title track of the album, "Fri. Sat. Sun", written and composed by Shinsadong Tiger, Monster Factory and Samuel Ku, was released at midnight on September 29, 2016. Promotions for the single began on M!Countdown broadcast by Mnet.

Track listing

References 

2016 EPs
Dal Shabet albums
K-pop EPs